Peter Antony Moran (born 13 April 1935) is the former Roman Catholic Bishop of the Diocese of Aberdeen, Scotland.

Early life
Moran was born in Glasgow. After early schooling in Lanarkshire and East Dunbartonshire, he spent nine years in further primary and then secondary education at St Aloysius' College, Glasgow, a Jesuit day school.

Priesthood

His formal education for the Catholic priesthood began with seven years at the Pontifical Scots College in Rome (1952-1959), where he was ordained priest in 1959 in the chapel of the Spanish College by Bishop Fernández-Conde of Córdoba.

He holds the degrees of Ph.L. and S.T.L. from the Pontifical Gregorian University in Rome. He is also a graduate of the University of Aberdeen, where he received an M.Ed. degree, as well as the University of Glasgow where he earned an M.A. (Hons.) degree in classics.

At the request of his bishop he attended the University of Glasgow to prepare for a teaching post in Blairs College, then the national minor seminary for Scotland. After graduating in 1963 he trained at Jordanhill College of Education and joined the Blairs College staff in 1964, where he remained until 1986.

He also served in a variety of pastoral appointments before becoming bishop: priest in charge of St. Mary’s Parish, Blairs; parish priest of Inverurie and also as chaplain to various schools.

For several years, he served as the Roman Catholic "corresponding member" of Gordon Presbytery of the Church of Scotland. He served from 1986 to 2002 on the Education Committees of now defunct Grampian Region and later of Aberdeenshire.

He is a Life Member of the Educational Institute of Scotland (E.I.S.) and chaplain to the French-speaking Catholic community of (mainly oil-related) expatriates in Aberdeen.

Bishop of Aberdeen
When Bishop Mario Conti became Archbishop of Glasgow on 22 February 2002, Peter Moran was elected to the caretaker post of Diocesan Administrator of Aberdeen before being appointed bishop by Pope John Paul II on 13 October 2003.

He was consecrated as Bishop of Aberdeen on 1 December 2003 by Archbishop Mario Joseph Conti in the Cathedral of St. Mary of the Assumption, Aberdeen.

His personal motto is, in Latin, Gaudium et spes - "Joy and Hope" - which is also the title of Vatican II's Pastoral Constitution on the Church in the Modern World.

References

External links
Catholic Hierarchy
Diocese of Aberdeen

1935 births
Living people
Clergy from Glasgow
Alumni of the University of Aberdeen
Alumni of the University of Glasgow
Bishops of Aberdeen
21st-century Roman Catholic bishops in Scotland
People educated at St Aloysius' College, Glasgow
Pontifical Gregorian University alumni
Scottish Roman Catholic bishops